Viktor Kuka (born 25 June 1990 in Pristina) is a Kosovar-Albanian professional footballer who plays as a defender for Ferizaj.

Club career
On 24 June 2015, Kuka left Prishtina and signed a two-year contract with Albanian Superliga side Teuta Durrës for an undisclosed fee. He made his début in his team's opening match of the 2015–16 season against Flamurtari Vlorë, playing in the first half before being substituted by Erand Hoxha. Kuka left the team on 4 January of the following year by terminated his contract by mutual consensus, being a free agent in the process. He ended his spell with Teuta by playing 12 matches between league and cup, as he was not able to gain a spot in the starting lineup.

In January 2019, Kuka was loaned out to KF Ferizaj from FC Drita.

Career statistics

References

External links

1990 births
Living people
Sportspeople from Pristina
Kosovan footballers
Association football defenders
FC Prishtina players
KF Teuta Durrës players
KF Llapi players
FC Drita players
KF Ferizaj players
Kategoria Superiore players
Football Superleague of Kosovo players
Kosovan expatriate footballers
Expatriate footballers in Albania
Kosovan expatriate sportspeople in Albania